Geniostoma is a genus of around 25 species of flowering plants in the family Loganiaceae. They are shrubs or small trees, with inflorescences borne in the axils of the simple, petiolate, oppositely-arranged leaves. The flowers are arranged in cymes, and each is pentamerous.

The genus is widely distributed across the Pacific Ocean from Japan, Malesia to Australia in the west, and east to the Tuamotu Archipelago; one species is also found on the Mascarene Islands.

The Hawaiian endemic genus Labordia has been included in Geniostoma by some authors. These two genera have been grouped together in the family "Geniostomaceae", but are considered by the Angiosperm Phylogeny Group to be part of a wider Loganiaceae.

Selected species

 Geniostoma astylum
 Geniostoma clavigerum
 Geniostoma confertiflorum
 Geniostoma gagneae
 Geniostoma huttonii (Lord Howe Island)
 Geniostoma ligustrifolium – hangehange
 Geniostoma macrophyllum
 Geniostoma petiolosum (Lord Howe Island)
 Geniostoma quadrangulare
 Geniostoma rapense
 Geniostoma rupestre
 Geniostoma stipulare
 Geniostoma sykesii (Cook Islands)
 Geniostoma umbellatum
 Geniostoma uninervium

References

Further reading

 
Gentianales genera
Taxonomy articles created by Polbot